John Gale (1925–1974) was a British journalist.

Early life
Gale was born in 1925 in Edenbridge, Kent and studied at Stowe School.

Career
After serving in the army he returned to London and became a successful journalist, working for The Observer during the 1950s and 1960s. He worked closely with the photographer Jane Bown.

He married Jill Robertson, and had three children: Joanna, James and Kiki. They lived in Hampstead Garden Suburb, North London.

He was famous for his quirky, witty, outspoken writing style. He famously took Groucho Marx to a cricket match in the mid-1950s.

While covering the war in Algeria, he saw a number of atrocities that had a direct effect on his mental health. He was treated for manic depression, and committed suicide in 1974, aged 49.

Works
Gale published a number of books which were well received by critics and the public.
 Clean Young Englishman (1965), republished June 27, 1988 by The Hogarth Press and now available as an e-book from Hodder & Stoughton
 Family Man (Hodder & Stoughton, 1968)
 Travels with a Son (1972)
 Camera Man (1979)

References

External links 
 
 

1925 births
1974 deaths
The Observer photojournalists
Suicides in the United Kingdom
People educated at Stowe School
British war correspondents
People from Edenbridge, Kent
20th-century British journalists
1974 suicides